János Pénzes (born 10 August 1943 in Bajmok, Kingdom of Hungary) was the Hungarian-born Roman Catholic Emeritus Bishop of Subotica between 1989 and 2020.

On June 29, 1968, Pénzes was ordained a priest. On April 25, 1989, Pope John Paul II appointed him bishop of Subotica. On June 18, 1989, he was ordained bishop by Archbishop Gabriel Montalvo Higuera.

He retired on 8 September 2020.

External links
http://www.catholic-hierarchy.org/bishop/bpenzes.html
http://www.gcatholic.org/dioceses/diocese/subo0.htm#3773

1943 births
People from Subotica
21st-century Roman Catholic bishops in Serbia
Serbian people of Hungarian descent
Living people
Hungarians in Vojvodina
20th-century Roman Catholic bishops in Serbia